Ștefănești is a commune in Floreşti District, Moldova. It is composed of two villages, Prodăneștii Vechi and Ștefănești.

References

Communes of Florești District